Alberto Varela (born 16 November 1940) is a Uruguayan fencer. He competed in the individual foil and épée events at the 1968 Summer Olympics.

References

External links
 

1940 births
Living people
Uruguayan male foil fencers
Olympic fencers of Uruguay
Fencers at the 1968 Summer Olympics
Sportspeople from Montevideo
Uruguayan male épée fencers
20th-century Uruguayan people